Baishya Saha or Saha, though not considered Vaishya in the caste structure of Bengal, is a Bengali Hindu trading caste traditionally known to have the occupation of grocers, shopkeepers, dealers moneylenders, and farming.

Origin 
The Upapuranas played a significant role to create the caste origin and hierarchy in Bengal. The name Saha (or Sadhu) is not found in 13th-century works like Brihaddharma Purana. According to historians, Sahas were originally wine sellers Shunri. In later period they tried to break away from their parent caste.

History 
Before the seventh or the eighth centuries A.D. when historical evidence indicates that the society was based largely on trade and commerce, the merchant classes had a notably high position in society. The low rank experienced by the Subarnabanik (gold merchants), Shunri (winemakers), Teli (oil producers), and in later times also by the Gandhabanik (the dealers in spices), possibly indicates that the primary economic activities of the Bengali society shifted from trade and capital producing devices to cottage industries and agriculture. The caste ranks of the merchant classes became more and more lowered and reached a decidedly low stage at the beginning of the Sena and Varman periods. Saha as a distinct sub-caste did not flourish in Bengal before the mid-nineteenth century. Saha is a merchant caste like Suvarna Banik, which has a low ceremonial rank, but a high secular rank. As of 1921, Suvarnabaniks and Sahas had a good literacy rate which was in the order mentioned.

Varna Status 
Traditionally the Bengal society is divided into two varna, Brahmin and Shudra. Sahas who belonged to the Shudra community started to claim Vaishya status in the 1931 censuses report, but the evidence of history, literature, and scriptures suggest nothing in favour of their claim.

See also
Saha (surname)

References

Bengali Hindu castes
Social groups of West Bengal